"I Wanna Dance with You" is a song co-written and recorded by American country music artist Eddie Rabbitt.  It was released in January 1988 as the first single and title track from the album I Wanna Dance with You.  The song was Eddie Rabbitt's thirteenth number one country single as a solo artist.  The single went to number one for one week and spent a total of fourteen weeks on the country chart.  It was written by Rabbitt and Billy Joe Walker Jr.

Charts

Weekly charts

Year-end charts

References

1988 songs
Eddie Rabbitt songs
1988 singles
Songs written by Eddie Rabbitt
Song recordings produced by Richard Landis
RCA Records singles
Songs written by Billy Joe Walker Jr.
Songs about dancing